Cochin Refineries Limited Ground or CRL Ground is a multi purpose stadium in Ambalamugal, Kochi, Kerala. The ground is mainly used for organizing matches of football, cricket and other sports. The ground is owned and managed by Cochin Refineries Limited. The ground has a capacity of 3,000 and School End, Fact End are two ends of the ground.

The stadium has hosted a Ranji Trophy match  in November 1992 when Kerala cricket team played against Goa cricket team until 1989 but since then the stadium has hosted non-first-class matches.

References

External links 

 Cricket archive
 Criconfo

Sports venues in Kochi
Cricket grounds in Kerala
Sports venues completed in 1992
1992 establishments in Kerala
20th-century architecture in India